A vicinal is a logological term for a word where all its letters have "alphabetic neighbors".  For instance, if a word has an "O" in it, to be a vicinal it must also have an "N" and/or a "P".  If none of the letters have alphabetic neighbors, it is known as a nonvicinal.

Some vicinals:
Blacksmith
Documents
Done
Fights
High
On
Sport
This

Some nonvicinals:
As
In
Intelligibility
Lacqueying
Mississippi
Mortgage
The

Some words that are neither:
About
Almanac
Dictionary
Times
Wisconsin

Word play